The following Union and Confederate Army units and commanders fought in the Battle of Helena of the American Civil War on July 4, 1863.

Abbreviations used

Military rank
 MG = Major General
 BG = Brigadier General
 Col = Colonel
 Ltc = Lieutenant Colonel
 Maj = Major
 Cpt = Captain

Other
 w = wounded
 mw = mortally wounded
 k = killed

Union

District of East Arkansas
MG Benjamin M. Prentiss

Confederate

District of Arkansas
LTG Theophilus H. Holmes

See also 
 List of Arkansas Civil War Confederate units
 Lists of American Civil War Regiments by State
 Confederate Units by State
 Arkansas in the American Civil War
 Arkansas Militia in the Civil War

References

External links
 Community & Conflict:  The Impact of the Civil War In the Ozarks
 Edward G. Gerdes Civil War Home Page
 The Encyclopedia of Arkansas History and Culture
 The War of the Rebellion: a Compilation of the Official Records of the Union and Confederate Armies
 The Arkansas History Commission, State Archives, Civil War in Arkansas

American Civil War orders of battle
Arkansas in the American Civil War
Conflicts in 1863
1863 in Arkansas
Military units and formations in Arkansas
Military in Arkansas